CHIJ Saint Joseph's Convent is a government-aided Catholic girls' secondary school in Sengkang, Singapore. The school is one of 11 Convent of the Holy Infant Jesus (CHIJ) schools in Singapore.

History 
The school was founded in 1938, as a private school in a rented house at 15 Flower Road, Singapore 549404. Initially there were 21 pupils and three staff – comprising one nun from the Order of the Holy Infant Jesus and two teachers. Prior to World War II, the enrolment rose to 79 students.

After the war, the school reopened in 1945 in a bungalow lent to the school by a neighbour. New school buildings were erected at the original site in 1947, and at 11 Hillside Drive, Singapore 548926 in the 1950s.

The school taught both primary and secondary students until 1974. The school's primary classes were then moved out to form two new schools – CHIJ Ponggol (later renamed CHIJ Our Lady of the Nativity) and CHIJ Our Lady of Good Counsel.

CHIJ St. Joseph's Convent moved to a new campus at 62 Sengkang East Way, Singapore 548595 in 2000. The new campus is built right next to St Anne's Church.

Notable alumni
 Margaret Lee, actress
 Sylvia Lim, opposition Member of Parliament for Aljunied GRC
 Jessica Tan, Member of Parliament for East Coast GRC
 Sumiko Tan, The Straits Times journalist

References

External links 
 Official Website 

Secondary schools in Singapore
Catholic schools in Singapore
Girls' schools in Singapore
Convent of the Holy Infant Jesus schools
Schools in Sengkang
Sengkang